Bukton is a surname. Notable people with the surname include:

Robert Bukton, MP for Suffolk (UK Parliament constituency)
Pierre Bukton (1350–1414), British politician and soldier